Bala Ditta (born Kuda Ditta, 4 February 1937 – 17 June 2003) is a Malaysian athlete who competed for Malaysia at the 1964 Summer Olympics. He has also represented the then Crown Colony of Sarawak at the Commonwealth and Asian Games.

Career
Kuda was selected to compete for the then British Crown Colony of Sarawak at the 1962 Commonwealth Games in Perth, Western Australia. He also competed for Sarawak at the 1962 Asian Games in Jakarta, Indonesia where he qualified for the semifinals of his event.

He became the first Malaysian from Sarawak to participate in the Summer Olympics, competing at the 1964 edition.

Kuda won the a bronze at the 1971 Southeast Asian Peninsular Games and a silver at the 1973 edition of the Games. Both medals were won at the 110 meter event.

Later life
After his retirement from competitive sports, Kuda served with the Police Field Force and coached recruits. He retired in December 1988 from the police.

Death 
He died due to stomach cancer at his residence in Padang Kerbau in Miri, Sarawak in 17 June 2003.

Personal life
Kuda is an Evangelical Christian from the Bario town in Sarawak. He was married to Ubung Taie Riwat with whom he had five children. Kuda changed his name to Bala Ditta following the birth of his first child.

References

1937 births
2003 deaths
People from Sarawak
Malaysian male hurdlers
Olympic athletes of Malaysia
Athletes (track and field) at the 1964 Summer Olympics
Malaysian police officers
Malaysian Christians
Kelabit people
Athletes (track and field) at the 1962 British Empire and Commonwealth Games
Commonwealth Games competitors for Sarawak
Athletes (track and field) at the 1962 Asian Games
Asian Games competitors for Sarawak
Southeast Asian Games medalists in athletics
Southeast Asian Games silver medalists for Malaysia
Southeast Asian Games bronze medalists for Malaysia